Fayette is a city in Fayette County, Iowa, United States. As of the 2020 census, the city population was 1,256.  It was named after the Marquis de la Fayette, French hero of the American Revolutionary War. Fayette is the home of Upper Iowa University, a small private college. The Volga River State Recreation Area is located just north of Fayette, and many other parks and natural areas are nearby.

William B. Dohrmann was the mayor for 24 years and ended his term in 2013.

Geography
Fayette is located on the Volga River. It is located just a few miles south of Volga River State Recreation Area

Demographics

2010 census
As of the census of 2010, there were 1,338 people, 434 households, and 185 families living in the city. The racial makeup of the city was 88.6% White, 6.7% African American, 1.9% Asian, 0.1% Pacific Islander, 1.0% from other races, and 1.6% from two or more races. Hispanic or Latino of any race were 2.8% of the population.

There were 434 households, of which 20.3% had children under the age of 18 living with them, 34.8% were married couples living together, 5.8% had a female householder with no husband present, 2.1% had a male householder with no wife present, and 57.4% were non-families. 37.1% of all households were made up of individuals, and 14% had someone living alone who was 65 years of age or older. The average household size was 2.18 and the average family size was 2.94.

The median age in the city was 22.3 years. 11.9% of residents were under the age of 18; 45.3% were between the ages of 18 and 24; 12.7% were from 25 to 44; 16% were from 45 to 64; and 14.1% were 65 years of age or older. The gender makeup of the city was 51.9% male and 48.1% female.

2000 census
As of the census of 2000, there were 1,300 people, 399 households, and 233 families living in the city. The racial makeup of the city was 88.54% White, 5.15% African American, 0.38% Native American, 2.54% Asian, 0.15% Pacific Islander, 1.38% from other races, and 1.85% from two or more races. Hispanic or Latino of any race were 3.23% of the population.

There were 399 households, out of which 28.3% had children under the age of 18 living with them, 47.6% were married couples living together, 7.0% had a female householder with no husband present, and 41.6% were non-families. 35.1% of all households were made up of individuals, and 15.0% had someone living alone who was 65 years of age or older. The average household size was 2.35 and the average family size was 3.05.

18.5% are under the age of 18, 37.0% from 18 to 24, 18.6% from 25 to 44, 14.5% from 45 to 64, and 11.3% who were 65 years of age or older. The median age was 23 years. For every 100 females, there were 124.1 males. For every 100 females age 18 and over, there were 128.2 males.

The median income for a household in the city was $28,750, and the median income for a family was $36,250. Males had a median income of $23,750 versus $19,135 for females. The per capita income for the city was $11,131. About 13.2% of families and 16.4% of the population were below the poverty line, including 11.0% of those under age 18 and 13.8% of those age 65 or over.

Education
Fayette is a part of the North Fayette Valley Community School District. It was previously a part of the Fayette Community School District, which merged into the North Fayette Community School District on July 1, 1984. That one in turn merged into the North Fayette Valley district on July 1, 2018.

Notable people
 Patrick Murphy, head softball coach at Alabama (1999–present)
 Minnie Bronson, anti-suffragist and General Secretary of the National Association Opposed to Woman Suffrage

References

External links
 City of Fayette official website

Cities in Iowa
Cities in Fayette County, Iowa